The Andalusian Army was a unit of the Spanish Republican Army that operated during the Spanish Civil War. Under its jurisdiction were the republican forces deployed in Eastern Andalusia.

History 
The Andalusian Army was created on October 19, 1937, as a new formation detached from the former Southern Army. It had its headquarters in the Granada town of Baza. Since its creation it was made up of two Army Corps, the IX and the XXIII, which covered the front that ran from the Villa del Río sector to the Mediterranean Sea . However, for most of its existence the army had hardly any outstanding military activity. The Andalusian Army published the newspaper Sur (South) between 1938 and 1939. Throughout its history, it had several commanders, among which are Colonel Adolfo Prada Vaquero and General Domingo Moriones Larraga. Although General Moriones supported the Casado coup towards the end of the war, the Casadistas replaced him with Colonel Francisco Menoyo Baños. The Andalusian Army dissolved itself at the end of March 1939.

Command 
 Commanders
 Infantry colonel Adolfo Prada Vaquero;
 Colonel of Cavalry Segismundo Casado;
 Brigadier General Domingo Moriones Larraga;
 Colonel of engineers Francisco Menoyo Baños;

Commissar
 Serafín González Inestal of the CNT;

 Chiefs of Staff
 Lieutenant Colonel Eugenio Galdeano Rodríguez;

 Head of Operations
 Infantry colonel Antonio Gómez de Salazar;

 General Commander of Artillery
 Lieutenant Colonel of Artillery Gerardo Armentia Palacios;
 Colonel of artillery José Valcázar Crespo;

 General Commander of Engineers
 Lieutenant Colonel of Engineers Manuel Mendicuti Palou;
 Lieutenant Colonel of Engineers Juan Castellano Gállego;

Order of battle

April 1938

References

Bibliography 
 
 
 
 
 
 
 
 
 
 

Military units and formations of the Spanish Civil War
Armed Forces of the Second Spanish Republic
Armies of Spain
Military units and formations established in 1937
Military units and formations disestablished in 1939